Tony Yang (born 30 August 1982) is a Taiwanese actor who rose to prominence for his debut film role in Formula 17 (2004), for which he won the Golden Horse Award for Best New Performer. He is also known for his roles in the Taiwanese box office hits Zone Pro Site (2013) and David Loman (2013), as well as starring in the television series Crystal Boys (2003), Holy Ridge (2006) and Ex-boyfriend (2011).

Filmography

Television series

Film

Variety and reality show

Music video appearances

Theater

Awards and nominations

References

External links

1982 births
Living people
Taiwanese male film actors
Taiwanese male television actors
Taiwanese male stage actors
Male actors from Taipei
21st-century Taiwanese male actors